Woollard is a village in Somerset, England.

Woollard may also refer to:

People 
Alison Woollard (born 1968), British geneticist
Chad Woollard (born 1979), Canadian ice hockey player
Frank George Woollard (1883–1957), British mechanical engineer
Gary Woollard, New Zealand rugby league player
Herbert Henry Woollard (1889–1939), Australian academic
Janet Woollard (born 1955), Australian politician
Joan Elizabeth Woollard (1916–2008), British artist
Joanne Woollard (died 2015), British art director
Joyce M. Woollard (1923–1997), British missionary in India
Rene Woollard (b.1984), British musician
William Woollard (born 1939), British television producer
Bob Woollard (born 1940), American basketball player
Denise Woollard (born 1940s), Canadian Alberta politician
John Woollard (1880–1965), Australian rules footballer

Other uses 
Mount Woollard, in Antarctica

See also 
Woollard v. Gallagher, a United States lawsuit